Marie-Amélie Cogniet (5 April 1798 – 29 April 1869) was a French painter and the sister of Léon Cogniet.

Life and work
Cogniet was born in Paris, France, as the sister of the painter and art teacher Léon Cogniet, whose works she copied. She specialized in portraiture and showed works at the Paris Salon from 1831.

Her copy of her brother's painting Portrait of Adélaide d'Orléans, then located at Chantilly, was included in the 1905 book Women Painters of the World.

Cogniet died in Paris.

References

Footnotes

Sources
 Biography

1798 births
1869 deaths
Painters from Paris
19th-century French painters
French women painters
19th-century French women artists
Sibling artists